The Backcountry Super Cubs Super Cub, also referred to as the Supercub replica, is an American amateur-built aircraft, designed and produced by Backcountry Super Cubs of Douglas, Wyoming. The aircraft is based on the design of the Piper PA-18 Super Cub and is supplied as a kit for amateur construction.

Design and development

The aircraft fuselage is made from welded steel tubing, with the wings constructed of aluminum sheet, all covered in doped aircraft fabric. The aircraft can be fitted with tundra tires for operation on soft or rough surfaces. Construction time from the supplied kit is 1200 hours.

Operational history
By December 2011, 138 examples had been reported as completed and flown.

Specifications (Super Cub)

References

External links

Homebuilt aircraft
Single-engined tractor aircraft
Backcountry Super Cubs aircraft